Perspicuibacter marinus is smooth, lenticular, light yellow, semi-translucent, circular colonies with a fluttered edge found on surface seawater at Muroto city, Kochi prefecture, Japan. “Cells contain carotenoid(s), and the dominant carotenoid that anatomically similar to beta carotene. Cells are 0.3–0.860.8–3.0 mm, grow at 15–31 uC (optimally at 22–30 uC), at pH 7.5–8.5 (optimally at pH 8.5) and with 2.0–3.5% (w/v) NaCl (optimally with 3.0 %)” according to Teramoto M in the article Perspicuibacter marinus gen. nov., sp. nov., a semi-transparent bacterium isolated from surface seawater, and description of Arenicellaceae fam. nov. and Arenicellales. For an energy source it utilizes Pyruvate as a single carbon source and does not degrade casein, chitin or starch. The 2-9 strain is a gram-stain-negative, non-motile, mesophilic, aerobic, rod-shaped bacterium.
Perspicuibacter marinus is general proposed novel species - a semi-transparent bacterium secluded from surface seawater of Muroto City, Kochi Prefecture, Japan, and description of Arenicellaceae family novel and Arenicellales ordinance novel.
Phylogenetic analyses based on the 16S rRNA gene sequence show that strain  2-9T (5NBRC 110144T5KCTC 42196T) fell within the class of Gammaproteobacteria and was most closely related to the genus Arenicella. According to results of the study - 92.7–93.0% 16S rRNA gene sequence similarities to type strains of species of this genus - of an unclassified order within this class. The DNA G+C content of strain 2-9T was 41.7 mol%.

References 

Teramoto M.; Yagyu K.-I.; Nishijima M (February 2015). “Perspicuibacter marinus gen. nov., sp. nov., a semi-transparent bacterium isolated from surface seawater, and description of Arenicellaceae fam. nov. and Arenicellales ord. nov.” Int J Syst Evol Microbiol. 65(Pt 2):353-8. doi: 10.1099/ijs.0.064683-0. Retrieved 3 March 2020.
Altschul S. F., Gish W., Miller W., Myers E. W., Lipman D. J.. ( 1990;). Basic local alignment search tool. . J Mol Biol 215:, 403––410. [CrossRef][PubMed]
Barrow G. I., Feltham R. K. A.. (editors) ( 1993;). Cowan and Steel's Manual for the Identification of Medical Bacteria, 3rd edn.. Cambridge:: Cambridge University Press;. [CrossRef]
DeLong E. F., Preston C. M., Mincer T., Rich V., Hallam S. J., Frigaard N. U., Martinez A., Sullivan M. B., Edwards R.. & other authors ( 2006;). Community genomics among stratified microbial assemblages in the ocean's interior. . Science 311:, 496––503. [CrossRef][PubMed]
Dyksterhouse S. E., Gray J. P., Herwig R. P., Lara J. C., Staley J. T.. ( 1995;). Cycloclasticus pugetii gen. nov., sp. nov., an aromatic hydrocarbon-degrading bacterium from marine sediments. . Int J Syst Bacteriol 45:, 116–– [Google Scholar]
Felsenstein J.. ( 1981;). Evolutionary trees from DNA sequences: a maximum likelihood approach. . J Mol Evol 17:, 368––376. [CrossRef][PubMed]
Felsenstein J.. ( 1985;). Confidence limits on phylogenies: an approach using the bootstrap. . Evolution 39:, 783––791. [CrossRef]

Gammaproteobacteria